Patrick Henry McCormick (October 25, 1855 – August 8, 1889) was an American pitcher in Major League Baseball in 1879, and from 1881 to 1883.
McCormick died in his hometown of Syracuse, New York at the age of 33.

On July 26, 1879,  McCormick, the Syracuse Stars' starting pitcher, hit a first-inning homer  to beat Tommy Bond and the Boston Red Stockings, 1–0. This is the first and, most likely, will be the only occurrence in major league history that a pitcher will record a 1–0 victory with his own first inning round-tripper being the game's lone run.

References

External links

1855 births
1889 deaths
Baseball players from Syracuse, New York
Major League Baseball pitchers
Syracuse Stars (NL) players
Worcester Ruby Legs players
Cincinnati Red Stockings (AA) players
19th-century baseball players
Syracuse Stars (minor league baseball) players
Albany (minor league baseball) players
Minneapolis Millers (baseball) players
Trenton Trentonians players